Juncus megacephalus, the bighead rush, is a plant species native to the United States.

Juncus megacephalus is a perennial herb spreading by means of underground rhizomes. Inflorescence is a panicle of up to 20 heads.

References

megacephalus
Flora of the Southeastern United States
Flora of Texas
Flora of Massachusetts
Taxa named by Moses Ashley Curtis
Flora without expected TNC conservation status